Cabatu is a surname. Notable people with the surname include:

 Junjun Cabatu (born 1984), Filipino basketball player
 Sonny Cabatu (born 1960), Filipino basketball player, father of Junjun